Michael Joseph Mohring (born March 22, 1974) is a former professional American football defensive tackle in the National Football League. He played five seasons for the San Diego Chargers (1997–2001).

Mohring played his high school ball at West Chester East High School and was recruited by the University of Pittsburgh.

Mohring is currently an assistant coach at West Chester Rustin High School.

1974 births
Living people
Sportspeople from Glen Cove, New York
Players of American football from New York (state)
American football defensive tackles
Pittsburgh Panthers football players
Miami Dolphins players
San Diego Chargers players